Penthostola is a genus of moths belonging to the subfamily Olethreutinae of the family Tortricidae.

Species
Penthostola albomaculatis (Liu & Bai, 1985)
Penthostola diakonoffi Kawabe, 1995
Penthostola hemeronyx (Diakonoff, 1953)
Penthostola nigrantis Kawabe, 1995
Penthostola semna Diakonoff, 1978
Penthostola tricolorana Kuznetzov, 2000

See also
List of Tortricidae genera

References

External links
tortricidae.com

Olethreutini
Tortricidae genera
Taxa named by Alexey Diakonoff